Preetha Krishna (also known as Preetha Ji, Preetha ji, Preethaji and Krishnapreetha Ramabagavaddasa; born 2 December 1974 in Chennai) is the daughter-in-law of Indian godman and cult leader Kalki Bhagawan. She is the co-founder and vice-chairperson of White Lotus Conglomerate.

Education 

Preetha Krishna attended the C.S.I. Ewart Matriculation Higher Secondary School in Chennai and received her Bachelor of Commerce at the Ethiraj College for Women in Chennai. She then pursued a Masters in Business Administration at the University of Southern Queensland in Toowoomba, Australia. She also has masters in philosophy from Madurai Kamaraj University in Madurai, Tamil Nadu.

Teaching and wellness programs 

In 2002 Preetha Krishna founded the Women's Movement for the Golden Age in Bangalore. In 2009 along with her husband, N.K.V. Krishna, also known as 'Krishnaji', she co-founded One World Academy, a philosophy and meditation school in Kanchipuram, that later turned into O&O Academy. She led a morning staff meeting at William Morris Endeavor, two sessions at the Sun Valley Wellness Festival in Idaho. and was part of the 2nd Eurasian Women's Forum, which took place in Saint Petersburg in September 2018. Preetha and N.K.V. Krishna consulted with life coach Tony Robbins on how they could promote their courses to westerners. Her husband claims to be a guru with 10 million followers in India.

White Lotus Conglomerate 

Preetha Krishna is the daughter-in-law of businessman and spiritual teacher Vijay Kumar Naidu, also known as 'Kalki Bhagawan'. Along with her husband, father-in-law and mother-in-law, she runs the White Lotus Conglomerate – an enterprise that includes real estate, property development, energy, media and sport. Preetha Krishna is co-founder and Vice Chairperson of White Lotus Conglomerate. In addition, she sits on the board of family businesses with names including Kosmik/Kosmic, Sacredbanyan, Transend, KPL, Bluewater, Golden Lotus, Goldenage, Chatrachaya, Yogi and Enlite. Many of these businesses exist only as mailing addresses. Preetha Krishna is a director of Kosmik Music and production company Kosmik Global Media, which owns the Bengaluru Bulls, a Pro Kabaddi League team.

The White Lotus Investment Group is based in Dubai, and has invested in The Pinnacle tower in Nairobi, the tallest in Africa, which is currently under construction. The Pinnacle is a joint venture between White Lotus, Jabavu Village and the Hass Petroleum Group. Between them, the White Lotus and Hass organisations are investing about US$200 million in the Pinnacle project. However, as of September 2019, construction of the Pinnacle had stalled. During 2019, the White Lotus Projects group was found to be in contempt of court for proceeding with the Pinnacle project in violation of two court orders issued in 2017.

The White Lotus Group owns the 1930s Redick Tower building in Lincoln, Nebraska which, after a $7 million re-development, it re-opened in 2010 as the Hotel Deco XV. The group has offices in Chicago and Omaha, Nebraska.

Income tax raids 

In October 2019, the Income Tax Department raided about 40 premises associated with the White Lotus Conglomerate. During the raid, the department confiscated cash and gold approximately worth $12 Million USD and unaccounted cash receipts for the amount of $55 Million USD from the fiscal years 2014 and 2015 onwards, according to the Indian Ministry of Finance. The investigation is in progress. Preetha and her husband were questioned by the Income Tax Department. Krishna also runs several companies that are into real estate, construction, publishing and micro-finance.

The enforcement directorate registered a case against 'Kalki' Bhagawan and N.K.V. Krishna under the Foreign Exchange Management Act. The Madras High Court granted time for the Income Tax Department to file its counter affidavit to a writ petition preferred by Preetha Krishna against a ‘look out circular’ issued by the department preventing her from flying abroad without an Income Tax Department clearance certificate. Preetha Krishna's request to travel to the USA and Ukraine was denied by the Income Tax Department assistant director K Mahadevan, who said that her presence would be necessary for the investigation.

References

External links 

 
 Interview about stress on China Global Television Network
 Preetha Krishna, interviewed by Lewis Howes

1974 births
Indian spiritual teachers
Living people
Indian real estate businesspeople
Indian businesspeople